The Apostolic Vicariate (or Vicariate Apostolic) of Puerto Ayacucho is a Latin Church missionary ecclesiastical jurisdiction or apostolic vicariate of the Catholic Church in Venezuela.
 
Its cathedral see, Catedral María Auxiliadora, is located in the town of Puerto Ayacucho, in Venezuela's Amazonas state. It is immediately exempt to the Holy See and not part of any ecclesiastical province.

History 
On 5 February 1932 Pope Pius XI established the Prefecture Apostolic of Alto Orinoco from territory taken from the then Diocese of Santo Tomás de Guayana (which meanwhile became the Metropolitan Archdiocese of Ciudad Bolívar).

It was elevated to a Vicariate Apostolic and given its present name by Pope Pius XII on 7 May 1953.

Incumbent Ordinaries 
So far, all incumbents have been members of the missionary Salesians (S.D.B.) congregation

Apostolic Prefects of Alto Orinoco
Enrico de Ferrari, S.D.B. † (14 Nov. 1932 – 3 Aug. 1945)
Cosma Alterio, S.D.B. † (31 Jan. 1947 – 1950)
Segundo García Fernández, S.D.B. † (21 Aug. 1950 – cfr. infra)

Apostolic Vicars
Segundo García Fernández, S.D.B. † (cfr. supra'' – 5 Oct. 1974)
Enzo Ceccarelli Catraro, S.D.B. † (5 Oct. 1974 – 23 Oct. 1989)
Ignacio Velasco, S.D.B. † (23 Oct. 1989 – 27 May 1995) Appointed, Archbishop of Caracas, Santiago de Venezuela
José Angel Divassón Cilveti, S.D.B. (23 Feb. 1996 – present)

See also 
 Roman Catholicism in Venezuela

Sources and references

External links 
 GigaCatholic, with more extensive ordinaries biographies

Apostolic vicariates
Roman Catholic dioceses in Venezuela
Christian organizations established in 1932
1932 establishments in Venezuela
Puerto Ayacucho